= Luke Grady =

American teacher and politician

Luke Grady was a teacher, reverend in the African Methodist Episcopal Church, and state legislator in North Carolina. He was African American.

Grady and other African American legislators lodged with Dr. W. H. Moore in Raleigh. He had been enslaved.

He represented New Hanover County during the 1885-1886 term.

== See also ==
- African American officeholders from the end of the Civil War until before 1900
